Salesio Lui is a Tokelauan politician. He was the head of government of Tokelau from February 1993 to February 1994 and again from 1 March 2013 to 24 February 2014.

References
  

Living people
Year of birth missing (living people)
Heads of Government of Tokelau
Members of the Parliament of Tokelau
Government ministers of Tokelau
People from Nukunonu